Padre Las Casas is a Chilean city and commune located in Cautín Province, Araucanía Region.

Demographics
Of these, 33,697 (57.3%) lived in urban areas and 25,098 (42.7%) in rural areas. Between the 1992 and 2002 censuses, the population grew by 26.9% (12,470 persons).

Notable people 

 Francisca Linconao, Mapuche rights defender

References

External links
 Municipality of Padre Las Casas

Communes of Chile
Populated places in Cautín Province
1995 establishments in Chile